Abu al-Nur Uthman Bey ibn Ali (27 May 1763 – 20 December 1814) was the sixth leader of the Husainid Dynasty and the ruler of Tunisia briefly in 1814.

References

Seev also
Youssef Saheb Ettabaa

18th-century people from the Ottoman Empire
19th-century people from the Ottoman Empire
18th-century Tunisian people
19th-century Tunisian people
1763 births
1814 deaths
Beys of Tunis
Tunisian royalty